Senator Martin may refer to:

Members of the United States Senate
Alexander Martin (1740–1807), U.S. Senator from North Carolina from 1793 to 1799
Edward Martin (Pennsylvania politician) (1879–1967), U.S. Senator from Pennsylvania from 1947 until 1959
George B. Martin (1876–1945), U.S. Senator from Kentucky from 1918 to 1919
John Martin (Kansas politician) (1833–1913), U.S. Senator from Kansas from 1893 to 1895
Thomas E. Martin (1893–1971), U.S. Senator from Iowa from 1955 to 1961
Thomas S. Martin (1847–1919), U.S. Senator from Virginia from 1895 to 1919

United States state senate members
Alexander E. Martin (1867–after 1830), Wisconsin State Senate
Allan W. Martin (1874–1942), Vermont State Senate
Barclay Martin (1802–1890), Tennessee State Senate
Bernard F. Martin (1845–1914), New York State Senate
Burleigh Martin (1888–1962), Maine State Senate
Burnham Martin (1811–1882), Ohio State Senate and Vermont State Senate
Charles Martin (Alabama politician) (1931–2012), Alabama State Senate
Dean Martin (politician) (fl. 1990s–2010s), Arizona State Senate
Fred Martin (Idaho politician) (fl. 1970s–2010s), Idaho State Senate
Frederick S. Martin (1794–1865), New York State Senate
Harry C. Martin (1854–1917), Ohio State Senate
Henri Martin (American politician) (fl. 2010s), Connecticut State Senate
Jerome Martin (1908–1977), Wisconsin State Senate
Jesse M. Martin (1877–1915), Arkansas State Senate
Jimmy Leawood Martin (born 1934), South Carolina State Senate
John L. Martin (born 1941), Maine State Senate
John Preston Martin (1811–1862), Kentucky State Senate
John Martin (Governor of Kansas) (1839–1889), Kansas State Senate
Joseph W. Martin Jr. (1884–1968), Massachusetts State Senate
Joseph Martin (general) (1740–1808), North Carolina State Senate
Larry A. Martin (born 1957), South Carolina Senate
Levi F. Martin (1843–1909), Wisconsin State Senate
Lewis J. Martin (1844–1913), New Jersey State Senate
Lynn Morley Martin (born 1939), Illinois State Senate
Marty Martin (Wyoming politician) (born 1951), Wyoming State Senate
Morgan Lewis Martin (1805–1887), Wisconsin State Senate
Noah Martin (1801–1863), New Hampshire State Senate
Robert Martin (New Jersey politician) (born 1947), New Jersey State Senate
Scott Martin (Pennsylvania politician) (fl. 2010s), Pennsylvania State Senate
Shane Martin (born 1971), South Carolina State Senate
Steve Martin (Virginia politician) (born 1956), Virginia State Senate
Thomas Martin (Maine politician) (fl. 2010s), Maine State Senate
Vincent A. Martin (1870–1951), Michigan State Senate
William Harrison Martin (1822–1898), Texas State Senate
William O'Hara Martin (1845–1901), Nevada State Senate

See also
Jack Martins (born 1967),  New York State Senate